Tranmere Rovers F.C. played the 1937–38 season in the Football League Third Division North. It was their 17th season of league football, and they finished first of 22, and were promoted. They reached the Third Round of the FA Cup. This remains Tranmere's sole championship in the Football League.

Football League

References 

Tranmere Rovers F.C. seasons